Mehdiabad (also Romanized as Mehdīābād) is a village in Bisheh Sar Rural District, in the Central District of Qaem Shahr County, Mazandaran Province, Iran. At the 2006 census, its population was 486, in 122 families.

References 

Populated places in Qaem Shahr County